Yehuda Leib Gordin (1853–1925) was a Polish rabbi, a gaon and Hebrew scholar. After serving nine years as a rabbi in Michalishok, then becoming chief of the rabbinical court in Ostrow, he became a rabbi in the city of Smorgon from 1903 to 1910.

The Chicago Daily Tribune wrote that Gordin was internationally renowned within Orthodox Judaism and was known as one of its foremost Hebrew scholars. Gordin was known as a Zionist and the author of Teshuvat Yehuda and many other books. He corresponded with Leo Tolstoy and was known for breadth and depth of learning. His defense of the Talmud against antisemitic attacks was cited in the Beilis Trial.

In 1908, two of his sons, Abba Gordin and Wolf (Ze'ev) Gordin, established a secular Hebrew school despite opposition from area Orthodox Jews; they became prominent anarchists during the early Russian Revolution. A third son, Morris Gordin, became a Communist Party member, later converting to Christianity. His eldest daughter, Bluma, mother to David Raziel, emigrated to Palestine in 1914.

In the last years of the rabbi's life, he led the Tifereth Zion congregation in Chicago, the rabbinical training school (Beth Hamedrash L'Horah), and the city's orthodox rabbinical association as the chief rabbi of the city. He died of heart disease during his evening prayers on April 11, 1925. A hundred Jewish organizations met to organize his services, which were held two days later. An estimated 30,000 people attended the procession. The crowd was too dense to navigate for six blocks surrounding the procession. Later that month, 10,000 Jews met in silent prayer for the rabbi.

References 

1854 births
1925 deaths
Orthodox rabbis from Russia
Polish Orthodox rabbis
Orthodox Judaism in Illinois
Zionists